İnce Burun, also Avlaka Burnu, is the westernmost point of Turkey. It is located at Gökçeada (older name in), at the entrance of Gulf of Saros in the northern Aegean Sea.

See also
Imbros

Weblink 
 The Most Extreme Points Of Turkey WorldAtlas.com

Headlands of Turkey
Landforms of Çanakkale Province